Cecropterus is a genus of skippers in the family Hesperiidae, within which it is placed in subtribe Eudamina. It has three subgenera: Cecropterus, Thorybes and Murgaria.

Species
As of 2019, the genus holds the following species:

Subgenus Cecropterus:
Cecropterus acanthopoda (O. Mielke, 1977)
Cecropterus rinta (Evans, 1952)
Cecropterus zarex (Hübner, 1818)
Cecropterus longipennis Plötz, 1882
Cecropterus evenus (Ménétriés, 1855)

Subgenus Thorybes:
Cecropterus lyciades (Geyer, 1832)
Cecropterus casica (Herrich-Schäffer, 1869)
Cecropterus tehuacana (Draudt, 1922)
Cecropterus confusis (E. Bell, 1923)
Cecropterus bathyllus (J. E. Smith, 1797)
Cecropterus mexicana (Herrich-Schäffer, 1869)
Cecropterus mexicana aemilea (Skinner, 1893)
Cecropterus mexicana blanca (Scott, 1981)
Cecropterus mexicana nevada (Scudder, 1872)
Cecropterus mexicana dobra (Evans, 1952)
Cecropterus mexicana mexicana (Herrich-Schäffer, 1869)
Cecropterus mexicana ducia (Evans, 1952)
Cecropterus diversus (E. Bell, 1927)
Cecropterus pylades (Scudder, 1870)
Cecropterus pylades indistinctus (Austin & J. Emmel, 1998)
Cecropterus pylades albosuffusa (H. Freeman, 1943)
Cecropterus pylades pylades (Scudder, 1870)
Cecropterus drusius (W. H. Edwards, [1884])
Cecropterus cincta Plötz, 1882
Cecropterus vectilucis (A. Butler, 1872)
Cecropterus pseudocellus (Coolidge & Clemence, [1910])
Cecropterus palliolum (H. Druce, 1908)
Cecropterus egregius (A. Butler, 1870)
Cecropterus egregius egregius (A. Butler, 1870)
Cecropterus egregius coxeyi (R. Williams, 1931)
Cecropterus virescens (Mabille, 1877)
Cecropterus dorantes (Stoll, 1790)
Cecropterus dorantes calafia (R. Williams, 1926)
Cecropterus dorantes dorantes (Stoll, 1790)
Cecropterus dorantes cramptoni (W. Comstock, 1944)
Cecropterus dorantes santiago (Lucas, 1857)
Cecropterus dorantes galapagensis (F. Williams, 1911)
Cecropterus obscurus (Hewitson, 1867)

Subgenus Murgaria:
Cecropterus albociliatus (Mabille, 1877)
Cecropterus albociliatus albociliatus (Mabille, 1877)
Cecropterus albociliatus leucophrys (Mabille, 1898)
Cecropterus albociliatus nocera (Plötz, 1882)
Cecropterus toxeus (Plötz, 1882)
Cecropterus jalapus (Plötz, 1881)
Cecropterus athesis (Hewitson, 1867)
Cecropterus phalaecus (Godman & Salvin, 1893)
Cecropterus reductus (N. Riley, 1919)
Cecropterus doryssus (Swainson, 1831)
Cecropterus doryssus chales (Godman & Salvin, 1893)
Cecropterus doryssus doryssus (Swainson, 1831)
Cecropterus doryssus albicuspis (Herrich-Schäffer, 1869)
Cecropterus albimargo (Mabille, 1875)
Cecropterus takuta (Evans, 1952)
Cecropterus rica (Evans, 1952)
Cecropterus trebia (Möschler, 1879)
Cecropterus carmelita (Herrich-Schäffer, 1869)
Cecropterus barra (Evans, 1952)

References

Natural History Museum Lepidoptera genus database

Eudaminae
Hesperiidae genera